The 2010 KNSB Dutch Super Sprint Championships in speed skating were held at the Ice-rink De Westfries ice stadium in Hoorn, Netherlands at 21 January 2010.

Schedule

Medalist

References

KNSB Dutch Super Sprint Championships
KNSB Dutch Super Sprint Championships
2010 Super Sprint
Sports competitions in North Holland
Sport in Hoorn